Paul William Mahady (November 19, 1908 – October 7, 1973) was a former member of the Pennsylvania State Senate, serving from 1959 to 1972.

References

1908 births
1973 deaths
20th-century American politicians
Democratic Party Pennsylvania state senators
People from Latrobe, Pennsylvania
Harvard College alumni